Franck Héry (born 26 April 1993) is a French professional footballer who plays as a defender for Championnat National 2 club US Saint-Malo.

Honours 
Les Herbiers
 Coupe de France runner-up: 2017–18

References

External links
 
 

1993 births
Living people
People from Guingamp
Sportspeople from Côtes-d'Armor
French footballers
Footballers from Brittany
Association football defenders
Ligue 1 players
Championnat National players
Championnat National 2 players
Championnat National 3 players
Stade Rennais F.C. players
Vannes OC players
En Avant Guingamp players
Les Herbiers VF players
US Granville players
US Saint-Malo players